Mauldeth Road railway station (known as Mauldeth Road for Withington until 1974) is a suburban railway station serving the Ladybarn area of Manchester, England. It is the last station before Manchester Piccadilly on the Styal Line and was electrified in 1959. The station sits on the Styal Line to Manchester Airport, one of the most congested lines on the national rail network.

It has been served by a half-hourly stopping service from Manchester Airport/Crewe to Manchester Piccadilly. Between May 2018 and December 2022, services operated on a skip-stop basis at irregular intervals to increase capacity on the line with a semi-fast service to Liverpool. From December 2022 the timetable reverted similar to pre-May 2018 with half-hourly stopping services; one terminating at Manchester Piccadilly and the other continuing onto Liverpool Lime Street.

History

The station opened in 1909, south of Longsight (Slade Lane Junction), as Mauldeth Road for Withington. It was renamed Mauldeth Road on 6 May 1974  and now serves the Manchester-Crewe (via Manchester Airport) rail route, used by Northern for stopping services to Manchester Airport. Its coal sidings closed in the 1960s, along with its original platform buildings on the up (southbound) side.

The remaining wooden ticket office, on the down platform, burned down on Bonfire Night in 1986; thereafter the ticket office was a small prefabricated unit at the bottom of the station approach.

It caters mainly for commuter traffic, being electrified at 25 kV AC overhead, and is used by EMU traffic. Some evening services are operated by TransPennine Express with DMUs.

2006 redevelopment

As part of a £12 million station modernisation programme on the Manchester Airport Line, re-building work on Mauldeth Road railway station commenced in autumn 2006. Network Rail were able to keep the station operational for most of the time by demolishing the existing platforms in small parts and using temporary platforms. There was a temporary footbridge spanning the platforms while the pedestrians' access ramp to the northbound platform was out of use during renovation; the footbridge offered a vantage point for views over Manchester. As part of the re-building work new steel platforms, modern waiting shelters, new lighting and access ramps were constructed with work completed by June 2007.

Recent developments
Following extensive redevelopment of the station in 2006, passenger numbers doubled from approximately 148,000 to 323,000 in the five years between 2007 and 2012.

The portakabin ticket office, used since the late 1980s, was closed and removed in April 2013. A new purpose-built ticket office, funded by Network Rail, was constructed in summer 2013 and opened in October 2013.

In March 2017, the old rail bridge over Mauldeth Road, originally from when the line opened in 1909, had come to end of its life and was replaced with a new bridge.

Service patterns
Historically, the station has been served by a half-hourly service each way to Manchester Piccadilly and Crewe. In 1993, following the opening of the railway station at Manchester Airport, every other service terminated and commenced at Manchester Airport while another continued onto either Wilmslow, Alderley Edge or Crewe.

The new 2018 timetable was the most radical in decades and notable for its poor introduction, which was marked by many delays and cancellations. As part of the May 2018 timetable change, the Styal Line to the Airport operated on a skip-stop basis to free up additional capacity for express trains. Consequently, Mauldeth Road station was still served by two services per hour but at more irregular intervals and not all services stop at the four other commuter stations on the Styal Line (and ), as has been the case historically.

Following a sustained fall in patronage between 2017 and 2021 attributed to the introduction of irregular calling patterns and increased unreliability following the 2018 timetable recast, in December 2022 Mauldeth Road reverted to a service similar to pre-2018 timetable with a half-hourly service at 30 minute intervals.

The southbound platform was upgraded in early 2023. Six-car Class 195 and 331 can call through Mauldeth Road due to automatic selective door operation (ASDO), however the southbound platform extension will allow two Class 323 units (which do not possess ASDO) to call at Mauldeth Road and double seating capacity on the service.

Facilities 
The station has a staffed ticket office on the ramp to Platform 1 (for trains to towards Manchester Piccadilly). There is also a ticket machine at the station situated adjacent to the ticket office. There is step-free access to both platforms. Next to Platform 2, there is a station car park.

Services

Historical
Since the opening of Manchester Airport railway station in 1993, the Monday to Saturday service pattern was 2 trains per hour to Manchester Piccadilly. 2 trains per hour operated in the opposite direction - one to Manchester Airport and the other continued onto Crewe until 17:53, then terminated at Wilmslow in the evening. Sunday services consisted of 1 train per hour to Manchester Airport, with one service every 2 hours continuing to Alderley Edge and 1 train an hour to Manchester Piccadilly.

Between May 2018 and December 2021, the service pattern was amended to increase capacity on the line with several services not stopping at the other intermediate stations towards . The Monday to Saturday service pattern consisted of
Sunday services consisted of:

Present

The current Monday - Saturday service pattern consists of:
 1 train per hour to  via

References

Further reading

External links

Withington
Railway stations in Manchester
DfT Category D stations
Former London and North Western Railway stations
Railway stations in Great Britain opened in 1909
Northern franchise railway stations
1909 establishments in England